Kenealy is a surname. Notable people with the surname include:

Amy Kenealy (born 1988), Irish cricketer
Don Kenealy, New Zealand rugby league player 
Edward Kenealy (1819–1880), Irish barrister and writer
Kathleen Kenealy, American attorney and politician
Robyn E. Kenealy (born 1983), New Zealand comic book artist
Suzanne Kenealy (born 1981), Irish cricketer
William Kenealy (1886–1915), Irish World War I soldier